The 22nd Satellite Awards is an award ceremony honoring the year's outstanding performers, films, television shows, home videos and interactive media, presented by the International Press Academy.

The nominations were announced on November 29, 2017. The winners were announced on February 11, 2018.

Special achievement awards
Auteur Award (for singular vision and unique artistic control over the elements of production) – Greta Gerwig

Humanitarian Award (for making a difference in the lives of those in the artistic community and beyond) – Stephen Chbosky

Mary Pickford Award (for outstanding contribution to the entertainment industry) – Dabney Coleman

Nikola Tesla Award (for visionary achievement in filmmaking technology) – Robert Legato

Best First Feature – John Carroll Lynch (Lucky)

Ensemble: Motion Picture – Mudbound

Ensemble: Television – Poldark

Motion picture winners and nominees

Winners are listed first and highlighted in bold.

Films with multiple nominations

Films with multiple wins

Television winners and nominees

Winners are listed first and highlighted in bold.

Series with multiple nominations

Series with multiple wins

New Media winners and nominees

References

External links
 International Press Academy website

Satellite Awards ceremonies
2017 film awards
2017 television awards
2017 video game awards